"Shut It Down" is a song by hip-hop artist/rapper Pitbull featuring Senegalese American R&B and hip hop recording artist and vocalist Akon. It was released as the fourth single from Pitbull's album, Pitbull Starring in Rebelution on November 2, 2009. A remix of the song features vocals by Clinton Sparks.

Music video
The music video was first released onto Pitbull's official Vevo channel on November 24, 2009 and was directed by David Rosseau. It has received over 35 million views. The video is about secrecy, intelligence agents and criminal activities, in which there was signed an agreement between the two groups and they agree to keep it a secret but this data is taken by agents of Pitbull in the end. Akon on the tip of information follows them but fails to capture them. The video ends with Pitbull and another woman in the plane and Akon looking at them from the ground.

Chart performance
"Shut It Down" debuted at number 85 on the US Billboard Hot 100 on the chart dated December 19, 2009. In its second week, the song moved to number 83 on the chart. On the week of February 13, 2010, the single reached its peak at number 42.

In the United Kingdom, "Shut It Down" peaked on the UK Singles Chart at number 33 on the chart dated February 6, 2010. The week before, it had reached its peak at number 13 on the UK R&B Chart.

Charts

Weekly charts

Year-end charts

Certifications

References

2009 singles
Pitbull (rapper) songs
Akon songs
Songs written by Pitbull (rapper)
Songs written by Akon
Songs written by Clinton Sparks
2009 songs
Songs written by DJ Snake